The Border Rivers are a group of Australian rivers and the associated region near part of the state border between New South Wales and Queensland.

The rivers rise in the New England Tablelands bioregion and drain the western side of the Great Dividing Range as they collectively form part of the headwaters of the Darling River within the Murray-Darling basin.

The Border Rivers flows through lands previously occupied by the Kamilaroi and Bigambul and other indigenous people. The Morella Watercourse, Boobera Lagoon, and Pungbougal Lagoon located on the Macintyre River floodplain is considered one of the most important Aboriginal places in eastern Australia. As one of the few permanent waterbodies in the northern Murray-Darling basin the complex provides refuge for wildlife during periods of drought. Sundown National Park also has ecological significance, hosting eleven rare and threatened animals, five rare or vulnerable plant species and permanent waterholes supporting a diverse range of waterbirds and aquatic biota.

 the catchment supported a population of around 50,000 people. The main agricultural use of land is for grazing and dryland cropping, and this covers around ninety per cent of the catchment.

Branches
Unhelpfully, several rivers have been given the same name to separate watercourses located in each state.

Queensland
Generally speaking the following rivers are considered to comprise part of the river group and region within Queensland:
Severn River (Queensland), draining the Stanthorpe district, and flowing into New South Wales
Pike Creek, including Glenlyon Dam, and flowing into New South Wales
Macintyre Brook, draining the  district, and flowing into New South Wales, near Yelarbon
Weir River, draining the Southern Downs district, and flowing into New South Wales, near Mungindi

New South Wales
The following rivers either mark the New South Wales boundary with Queensland, or are fully located within the state and are considered to comprise part of the river group and region:
Mole River, draining the  district
Dumaresq River, receiving flows from the Severn River (Queensland), Pike Creek, and the Mole River
Severn River (New South Wales), draining the  district, including the Pindari Dam
Macintyre River, receiving flows from the Severn River (New South Wales), and forming through the confluence of the Dumaresq River and Macintyre Brook. The Macintyre River variously flows in both New South Wales and Queensland

Within New South Wales, both the Macintyre and Weir rivers drain to become the Barwon River, a major tributary of the Darling River within the Murray-Darling basin.

The Macintyre River forms the border west of Boggabilla to Mungindi.

Towns
The main activities in the Border Rivers region is agriculture.  Crops are grown in areas with suitable conditions and the rest of the area is used for grazing.  Because the rivers are quite small and erratic in flow, there is only small-scale irrigation.

The largest town in the western part of the Border Rivers region is Goondiwindi where the Newell Highway crosses the Macintyre River at the state border. The towns of Stanthorpe, in Queensland and Tenterfield, Glen Innes in New South Wales lie along the New England Highway on the eastern edges of the Border Rivers Basin. Inverell lies to the west on the western edge of the New England Tablelands. The central part of the Border Rivers region is rather underpopulated with no large towns, major transport routes, or significant industries other than agriculture.  Small towns in the region include , Inglewood, Bonshaw, .

See also

 List of rivers of New South Wales
 Rivers of Queensland

References

Attribution 
 Required attribution: © Commonwealth of Australia.

External links
 
 
 Gywdir & Border Rivers catchment management agency -  NSW Government website
 

Rivers of New South Wales
Rivers of Queensland
Regions of New South Wales
Regions of Queensland
Borders of New South Wales
Borders of Queensland
Murray-Darling basin
Southern Downs Region
Moree Plains Shire
Armidale Regional Council
Uralla Shire
Tenterfield Shire